Jørgen Gabrielsen (born 11 October 1935) is a Danish former sports shooter. He competed in the 50 metre pistol event at the 1968 Summer Olympics.

References

External links
 

1935 births
Living people
Danish male sport shooters
Olympic shooters of Denmark
Shooters at the 1968 Summer Olympics
People from Hillerød Municipality
Sportspeople from the Capital Region of Denmark